Shyla Angela Prasad (born 1996) is a model and beauty pageant titleholder, holding the titles of Miss Australia, Miss Fiji and Miss Oceania.

Personal life and career 
Prasad attended Hurlstone Agricultural High School, studied law at the University of Technology Sydney, and studied acting at the National Institute of Dramatic Arts Sydney.

Pageantry

Miss Oceania 2017 
In 2017, Prasad was awarded the title of Miss Oceania 2017. She represented Oceania at the Miss Continents Pageant 2017 in Las Vegas, Nevada, where she won 'Best In Swimwear'.

Miss Earth Fiji 2015 
Prasad was awarded the title of Miss Earth Fiji 2015. She represented Fiji at the Miss Earth 2015 pageant on 5 December 2015 in Vienna, Austria. She won three gold medals and the Most Cheerful Award, the highest placement recorded for Fiji in Miss Earth.

Miss Galaxy Australia 2015 
In 2015, Prasad competed in the Miss Galaxy Australia pageant where she won the title of Miss Charity Galaxy Australia 2015.

References 

Miss Earth 2015 contestants
Australian beauty pageant winners
Living people
1995 births